Sergey Savelyev (born 18 April 1972) is a Russian speed skater. He competed in the men's 500 metres event at the 1998 Winter Olympics.

References

External links
 

1972 births
Living people
Russian male speed skaters
Olympic speed skaters of Russia
Speed skaters at the 1998 Winter Olympics
Sportspeople from Ivanovo